The 1922–23 season was Maccabi Jerusalem's 12th season since its establishment in 1911. As the local football association wasn't founded until July 1928, there were no officially organized competitions during the season, and the club played only friendly matches.

Overview
After a period of over a year of inactivity, the club was re-organized in July 1923, with several clubs becoming affiliated to the Maccabi organization in Jerusalem. The Maccabi organization set up a 6-team league, which was designed to be played between July and October 1923. However, the league was stopped after several weeks in order to reorganize the competition.

Known matches
The following is a list of matches played by Maccabi affiliated teams during the season.

References

Maccabi Jerusalem F.C. seasons
Maccabi Jerusalem